Clare Stone (born 1992) is a Canadian nurse and former actress.

Career 
She has appeared in such films and television works as Would Be Kings, The Jane Show, Breach, Mom at Sixteen, Samantha: An American Girl Holiday, Godsend, Shattered City: The Halifax Explosion, Beautiful Girl, and Mr. Nobody. Stone has also starred in CBC Television's Wild Roses as Charlotte Henry and in the episode "Run to Me" of CTV's Flashpoint series as Sarah Porter. Stone was nominated for a Gemini Award, Best Performance by an Actress in a Featured Supporting Role in a Dramatic Program or Mini-Series, in 2008.

Stone has retired from acting and now works as a psychiatric nurse and researcher.

Personal life 
Stone married Noah Reid in July 2020, and their first child together, a son, was born in late summer 2022.

Filmography

Film

Television

References

External links

 

Canadian film actresses
Canadian television actresses
Place of birth missing (living people)
Living people
1992 births